In Greek mythology Leucothoe (Ancient Greek: , from , "white", and , "quick, swift") was a Babylonian princess. The daughter of Orchamus, a king of Persia, Leucothoe was either a lover of the sun god Helios or a victim of rape. A nymph or Leucothoe's own sister named Clytie, who loved Helios and was jealous of Leucothoe, informed Leucothoe's father that Leucothoe, despite being unmarried, was no longer a virgin, whereupon Orchamus buried his daughter alive in punishment. Helios then transformed Leucothoe's dead body into a frankincense tree.

The tale is best known from the Augustan poet Ovid's narrative poem Metamorphoses, in which the fullest account of it survives, although references and allusions to Leucothoe's story survive in other sources as well.

Mythology

Ovid 
As punishment for informing her husband Hephaestus of her affair with Ares, Aphrodite cursed Helios to fall in love with Leucothoe. Helios, utterly enamored with her, lingered in the sky by rising earlier and setting later just to spend more time watching her, making the winter days longer. He forgot about all of his previous lovers, including Rhodos, Clymene, Perse, and Clytie, who, having been loved and abandoned by him, felt betrayed. 

Eventually, Helios disguised himself as her mother, Eurynome, to gain entrance to her chambers, and once he got there he dismissed her servants and revealed himself to Leucothoe. He confessed his love to her, and she, "conquered, suffered his force" according to Ovid, or he made love to her in others.

But Clytie, still in love with him and consumed with jealousy, reported Leucothoe's affair to her father Orchamus, who punished his defiled daughter by burying her alive, as she pleaded with him in despair. Leucothoe died before Helios could save her. Overcome with grief, Helios shone his rays upon her but could not revive her. So he sprinkled her body with "fragrant nectar" and turned her into a frankincense tree so that she would still breathe air, after a fashion, instead of staying buried beneath the earth. Clytie meanwhile, scorned by Helios for her involvement in Leucothoe's death, sat on the ground pining away, neither eating nor drinking, constantly turning her face toward the Sun, until finally she became the heliotrope, whose purple flowers follow the Sun every day on his diurnal journey across the sky.

Other versions 
According to Lactantius Placidus, Ovid got this myth from Hesiod, although some scholars doubt this particular attribution. His abridged version largely follows Ovid's own, but contains certain differences. Like Ovid, Lactantius does not not make it clear how Clytie knew about Helios and Leucothoe, or how Helios knew it was Clytie who had informed the king. 

In another narrative, after Helios had intercourse with Leucothoe, the girl who caused Leucothoe's doom is identified as her (unnamed) sister, and their father name is Orchomenus instead, which is also the name of a town in Beotia, suggesting in this version the myth took place there and not in Babylon. The anonymous author mentions by name the plants the two sisters turned into, contrasting the vagueness of Ovid's telling. Hyginus might have known a very different version of this myth, for he names one of the Argonauts, Thersanon, as the son of Helios and Leucothoe, and places her in Andros rather than Persia, implying a version where Leucothoe survives (at least for as long as it took to produce a child), though he could simply refer to a different Leucothoe.

Some scholars have suggested that the stories of Leucothoe and Clytie were originally two distinct ones that were combined along with a third story, that of Helios discovering Ares and Aphrodite's affair and then informing Hephaestus, into a single tale either by Ovid himself or Ovid's source.

Culture 
It's been suggested that this myth was used to explain the use of frankincense in the god's worship, similar to the story of the nymph Daphne who transformed into a laurel tree; Leucothoe's death by burial at the hands of her male guardian, not unlike Antigone's fate, might denote archaic cult practices involving human sacrifice in tree-related worship.

See also 

 Smilax
 Crocus
 Hyacinthus
 Picolous
 Libanus

Footnotes

Notes

References 

 Anderson, William S., Ovid's Metamorphoses, Books 1-5, University of Oklahoma Press, 1997. .
 Cameron, Alan, Greek Mythography in the Roman World, Oxford University Press, 2004, . Google books.
 
 Gantz, Timothy, Early Greek Myth: A Guide to Literary and Artistic Sources, Johns Hopkins University Press, 1996, Two volumes:  (Vol. 1),  (Vol. 2).
 Grimal, Pierre, The Dictionary of Classical Mythology, Wiley-Blackwell, 1996. .
 Hard, Robin, The Routledge Handbook of Greek Mythology: Based on H.J. Rose's "Handbook of Greek Mythology", Psychology Press, 2004, . Google Books.
 Hesiod, Theogony, in The Homeric Hymns and Homerica with an English Translation by Hugh G. Evelyn-White, Cambridge, MA., Harvard University Press; London, William Heinemann Ltd. 1914. Online text available at Perseus.tufts.
 Lateinische Mythographen: Lactantius Placidus, Argumente der Metamorphosen Ovids, erstes heft, Dr. B. Bunte, Bremen, 1852, J. Kühtmann & Comp.
 Ovid, Metamorphoses: The New, Annotated Edition, translated by Rolfe Humphries, annotated by J. D. Reed, Indiana University Press, 2018, .
 Ovid, Metamorphoses, translation by Anthony S. Kline, 2000, text available at Poetry In Translation.
 Ovid. Metamorphoses, Volume I: Books 1-8. Translated by Frank Justus Miller. Revised by G. P. Goold. Loeb Classical Library No. 42. Cambridge, Massachusetts: Harvard University Press, 1977, first published 1916. . Online version at Harvard University Press.
 Parada, Carlos, Genealogical Guide to Greek Mythology, Jonsered, Paul Åströms Förlag, 1993. .
 Paradoxographoe, by Anton Westermann, Harvard College Library, 1839, London.
 Publius Ovidius Naso, Metamorphoses translated by Brookes More (1859-1942). Boston, Cornhill Publishing Co. 1922. Online version at the Perseus Digital Library.
Publius Ovidius Naso, Metamorphoses. Hugo Magnus. Gotha (Germany). Friedr. Andr. Perthes. 1892. Latin text available at the Perseus Digital Library.
 Smith, William, Dictionary of Greek and Roman Biography and Mythology, London (1873). Online version at the Perseus Digital Library.
 Tripp, Edward, Crowell's Handbook of Classical Mythology, Thomas Y. Crowell Co; First edition (June 1970). .

External links 
 

Metamorphoses characters
Metamorphoses into trees in Greek mythology
Princesses in Greek mythology
Women of Helios
Helios in mythology
Deeds of Aphrodite
Boeotian mythology
Asia in Greek mythology